Shuangbaotai or horse hooves is a sweet Taiwanese fried dough food with chewy dough containing large air pockets on the inside and a crisp crust on the outside. It is made by twisting two small pieces of dough together and frying them, causing them to separate slightly while remaining connected.

Names
The Mandarin Chinese name of this food, shuāngbāotāi meaning "twins", is derived from the fact that the dish is two pastries twisted slightly together as if conjoined twins.  The Taiwanese Hokkien name is 馬花糋 (bé-hoe-chìⁿ), which roughly means "horse-hoof cake", also in reference to its shape. Another Hokkien name is 雙生仔 (siang-siⁿ-á) meaning twins.

Regional
In Taiwan, shuangbaotai are a type of snack (xiaochi) typically sold by hawkers at street stalls or in night markets, but not in regular restaurants or bakeries.

See also
 Taiwanese cuisine
 List of desserts
 List of doughnut varieties
 List of fried dough varieties

Other Chinese fried dough dishes
 Ham chim peng
Ox-tongue pastry
Youtiao

References

External links

YTower — A famous maker of shuangbaotai 
Shuangbaotai  at Chiayi Tourism Bureau website — includes photos of shuangabotai 

Singaporean cuisine
Taiwanese cuisine
Doughnuts